Alexander Reid (1586?–1643) was a Scottish physician to Charles I of England.

His brother Thomas Reid (humanist) was Greek and Latin secretary to James I.

References

Wikisource link

1580s births
1643 deaths
Scottish surgeons